Bezirksamtmann (plural Bezirksamtleute) is a German administrative title of gubernatorial or lower rank, roughly translating as equivalent to the British District Officer. It is derived from Bezirk ("district") + Amtmann ("official").

Colonial use
The title was used for colonial officials in the following minor German Schutzgebiete (i.e. colonial possessions of various status) in the Pacific:
(probably incomplete list)
Jaluit (Marshall Islands), subordinate of the colonial governor of German New Guinea
1906 - 30 April 1907   Victor Berg  (b. 1861 - d. 1907)
1907                   Joseph Siegwantz (acting)
1908 - November 1909   Wilhelm Stuckhardt  (d. 1909)
November 1909 - 1910   Berghausen (interim)
1910 - 1911            Georg Merz; he stayed on as only Stationsleiter ('Station chief') (1911 - 3 October 1914), subordinate to the Eastern Caroline islands district, see below
 Nauru, until 1888 a tribal protectorate, till 1889 under a Reichskommissar
2 October 1888 - May 1889  Robert Rasch (acting)
May 1889 - 1895    Christian Johannson
1895 - 1898        Fritz Jung
1899 - 1906        Ludwig Kaiser  (b. 1862 - d. 1906); afterwards the jurisdiction was downgraded and administered by Station Chiefs (Stationsleiter), from 1911 subordinated to the administrators of Ponape district (in the Eastern Carolinas, cfr. infra)
Marianen Inseln (German for 'Marianas Islands', i.e. the Northern Marianas, sold by Spain), as subordinate of the colonial governor of German New Guinea :
November 1899 - April 1907   Georg Fritz (on Saipan)
1904 - 1907   Volker Reichel (on Rota island); afterwards administered by a Stationsleiter ('Station chief') who was subordinated to a district officer in Micronesia and thus to his superiors
in Micronesia, which was 18 July 1899 - 7 October 1914 under the authority of  the governors of German New Guinea (and their Vice-governors of German New Guinea, which had the general supervision over the island districts), there were two island districts, under District officers which from 1889 were styled Bezirksamtmann:
 Western Caroline islands (Yap and Palau [and from 1907 Saipan)
29 June 1886 - 18..    Manuel de Elisa
.... - ....              ....
before November 1897 - after November 1898  S. Cortes
1899 - 1909            Arno Senfft  (b. 1864 - d. 1909)
1909                   Rudolf Karlowa
1909 - 1910            Georg Fritz
1910 - 1911            Hermann Kersting
1911 - 1914            Baumert
 Eastern Caroline islands (Ponape [and from 1911 the Marshall Islands, cfr. supra])
June 1886 - 1887        Capriles
14 March 1887 - 1887    Isidro Posadillo  (d. 1887)
October 1887 - January 1891  Luis Cadarso y Rey  (d. 1898)
c.1894                  Concha
before November 1897 - after November 1898  J. Fernandez de Cordoba
12 October 1899 - August? 1901  Albert Hahl   (b. 1868 - d. 1945)
1 September 1901 - 30 April 1907  Victor Berg  (b. 1861 - d. 1907)
1907 - 1908?             Girschner (acting)
1908 - 1909              Georg Fritz
1909 - 18 October 1910   Gustav Boeder  (d. 1910)
1910 - 7 October 1914    August Überhorst  ...

German speaking countries

Germany
The Bezirksamtmann used to be the head officer of the Bezirksamt (district) in Bavaria and the Palatinate between 1862 and 1920.

Switzerland
Several cantons in Switzerland have a Bezirksamtmann or Bezirksammann as head officer of the Bezirksamt (district).

Sources and references
 WorldStatesmen- links to each nation

Gubernatorial titles